The 1949 season was the thirty-eighth season for Santos FC.

References

External links
Official Site 

Santos
1949
1949 in Brazilian football